In molecular biology, AfaR small RNA is an Hfq-dependent small RNA produced by the bacterium Escherichia coli. It is an Hfq-dependent RNA which downregulates AfaD-VIII invasin translation by binding to and initiating cleavage of its mRNA.

The transcription of AfaR is dependent on the  stress response sigma factor sigma E.

See also
Bacterial small RNA

References

RNA
Non-coding RNA